The Men's snowboard slopestyle competition at the FIS Freestyle Ski and Snowboarding World Championships 2023 was held on 24 and 27 February 2023.

Qualification
The qualification was started on 24 February at 10:00. The eight best snowboarders from each heat qualified for the final.

Heat 1

Heat 2

Final
The final was started on 27 February at 15:15.

References

Men's snowboard slopestyle